Sonyae Elise is an American singer-songwriter based in Los Angeles who won the inaugural and only season of Platinum Hit, a Bravo American television channel show about competing emerging songwriters.

Her prizes included $100,000 as a cash prize, an RCA/Jive Records contract and a publishing deal with The Writing Camp. According to her interview with Billboard Magazine, Elise does not read music nor can she play any instruments. "I have a lot of old stuff at my mother's house, notebooks and things with scripts and lyrics written in them. I did a lot of theater – 'Grease,' 'The Lion King' – and I wanted to write music for plays. Lyrics came naturally to me. I listened to a lot of pop music and KRS-One and MC Lyte and I saw (writing) as a way to express my thoughts." For her winning song, she wrote "My Religion" which was released as a single after her victory.

Songwriting credits and other vocal appearances

Credits and appearances are courtesy of Discogs and AllMusic.

Awards and nominations

References

External links
Platinum Hit
Sonyae Elise page on Bravo website
Discogs-Sonyae Elise
Allmusic-Sonyae Elise

American women singer-songwriters
Reality show winners
Living people
21st-century American singers
21st-century American women singers
Year of birth missing (living people)